Tori is primarily a given name.  It is more common among females, and it is sometimes a diminutive of the given name Victoria. One meaning of the name in Japanese is bird.

Notable people with the name include:

Given  name 
 Tori (wrestler) (born 1964), ring name of American bodybuilder and professional wrestler Terri Poch
 Tori Alamaze (born 1977), American singer
 Tori Allen-Martin (born 1986), English actress
 Tori Amos (born 1963), American pianist and singer-songwriter
 Tori Anderson (born 1988), Canadian actress
 Tori Anthony, American pole vaulter
 Tori Black (born 1988), American pornographic actress
 Tori Bowie (born 1990), American long jumper
 Tori Busshi, Japanese sculptor of Chinese ancestry active around 600 AD
 Tori Carrington, Greek-American writer
 Tori Dilfer, American volleyball player
 Tori Dixon, American volleyball player
 Tori Dunlap, American investor, feminist, and social media personality
 Tori Fixx, American hip-hop performer and producer
 Tori Foster (born 1982), Canadian artist
 Tori Franklin (born 1992), American triple jumper
 Tori Freestone, British saxophonist
 Tori Groves-Little (born 2000), Australian rules footballer
 Tori Gurley (born 1987), American football player
 Tori Hall (born 1986), American beauty queen
 Tori Haring-Smith, American academic administrator, president of Washington & Jefferson College
 Tori Huster (born 1989), American soccer player
 Tori James (born 1981), Welsh mountain climber
 Tori Jankoska (born 1994), American basketball player
 Tori Kelly (born 1992), American singer-songwriter
 Tori Kewish (born 1997), Australian darts player
 Tori Koana (born 1995), Japanese curler
 Tori Kropp, American author
 Tori Kudo, Japanese musician, composer and potter
 Tori Lacey (born 1973), American weather forecaster
 Tori Lyons, Welsh actor
 Tori Matsuzaka (born 1988), Japanese model
 Tori Murden (born 1963), American rower, explorer and adventurer
 Tori Nelson (born 1976), American professional boxer
 Tori Nonaka (born 1995), American sport shooter
 Tori Paul (born 2002), American footballer
 Tori Pena (born 1987), American pole vaulter
 Tori Penso, American soccer referee
 Tori Polk (born 1983), American long jumper
 Tori Praver (born 1986), American model
 Tori Reid (born 1971), American actress
 Tori Sparks (born 1983), American singer-songwriter
 Tori Spelling (born 1973), American actress
 Tori Stafford (2000–2009), Canadian murder victim
 Tori Trees (born 1965), American swimmer
 Tori Welles (born 1967), American pornographic actress

Fictional characters 
 Tori Hanson, character from Power Rangers Ninja Storm, played by Sally Martin
 Tori Scott, character from American TV series Saved by the Bell, played by Leanna Creel
 Tori Vega, character from Victorious, played by Victoria Justice
 Tori Avalon, the Cardcaptors name for the Cardcaptor Sakura character Touya Kinomoto, voiced by Tony Sampson
 Princess Tori, character from Barbie: the Princess and the Popstar, voiced by Kelly Sheridan

Surname 
 Elizabeth Tori (born 1936), American politician
 Miki Tori (born 1958), Japanese manga artist, character designer, essayist, and screenplay writer

See also
Torey (name), given name and surname

References

English feminine given names
Given names derived from birds
Japanese unisex given names